The Melody of Death is a 1915 crime novel by the British writer Edgar Wallace. Believing that he is suffering from a fatal illness a newly-married man begins to commit a series of crimes to make sure his wife will be provided for after his death.

Film adaptation
In 1922 the story was turned into a silent film Melody of Death directed by Floyd Martin Thornton, one of a number of Wallace adaptations made by Stoll Pictures.

References

Bibliography
 Clark, Neil. Stranger than Fiction: The Life of Edgar Wallace, the Man Who Created King Kong. The History Press, 2015.
 Goble, Alan. The Complete Index to Literary Sources in Film. Walter de Gruyter, 1999.

External links
 

1915 British novels
British crime novels
British novels adapted into films
Novels by Edgar Wallace